Rouvres-en-Multien is a commune in the Oise department in northern France. As of 2019, it had a population of 472.

See also
Communes of the Oise department

References

Communes of Oise